The Changsha-Shaoshan-Loudi Expressway commonly abbreviated as Changshaolou Expressway, is a major expressway of Hunan province, China, linking the cities of Changsha, Shaoshan, Xiangxiang, Loudi, and Lianyuan. It is 139.151 km in length.

Route
The expressway passes the following major cities:

 Yuelu District, Changsha
 Ningxiang
 Shaoshan
 Xiangxiang
 Louxing District, Loudi
 Lianyuan

Scenic spots
 Yuelu Mountain and Yuelu Academy
 Liu Shaoqi's Former Residence
 Huitang Hot Spring
 Mao Zedong's Former Residence

References

External links

Transport in Hunan
Expressways in Changsha
Expressways in Xiangxiang
Expressways in Loudi
Expressways in Lianyuan
2014 establishments in China